Boylan Apartments is a historic apartment complex located in Raleigh, Wake County, North Carolina.  The three buildings were built in 1935, and are three-story, Colonial Revival style brick buildings arranged in a 
"U" shape plan around an open courtyard.  Each building consists of 18 one and two-bedroom units. They were designed by the architectural firm Linthicum & Linthicum and built with funds supplied by the Public Works Administration (PWA).

It was listed on the National Register of Historic Places in 2007.

References

Public Works Administration in North Carolina
Residential buildings on the National Register of Historic Places in North Carolina
Colonial Revival architecture in North Carolina
Residential buildings completed in 1935
Buildings and structures in Raleigh, North Carolina
National Register of Historic Places in Raleigh, North Carolina